Scalesia retroflexa is a species of flowering plant in the family Asteraceae. It is found only in Ecuador. It is threatened by habitat loss.

References

retroflexa
Flora of Ecuador
Vulnerable plants
Taxonomy articles created by Polbot